The William Bartram Arboretum is an arboretum near Wetumpka, Alabama, in the United States.  It is located off U.S. Route 231, at 2521 Fort Toulouse Road.  The arboretum is named in honor of the 18th century naturalist William Bartram, who visited the area in 1776 while studying local flora and fauna.

Operated by the Alabama Historical Commission, the  William Bartram Arboretum is a part of the   Fort Toulouse-Jackson Park at the confluence of the Coosa and Tallapoosa Rivers.  It opened on June 5, 1977, as a joint project of The Garden Club of Alabama and the Alabama Historical Commission.  The arboretum is a boardwalk and series of paths through wildflower fields, bogs, and forests from the visitor's center to Fort Toulouse, then down to an overlook of the Tallapoosa River. Shrubs and flowers are identified.  The arboretum is open sunrise to sunset all year long.

See also
 List of botanical gardens and arboretums in Alabama

References

Botanical gardens in Alabama
Arboreta in Alabama
Protected areas of Elmore County, Alabama